In astronomy, the velocity dispersion (σ) is the statistical dispersion of velocities about the mean velocity for a group of astronomical objects, such as an open cluster, globular cluster, galaxy, galaxy cluster, or supercluster. By measuring the radial velocities of the group's members through astronomical spectroscopy, the velocity dispersion of that group can be estimated and used to derive the group's mass from the virial theorem. Radial velocity is found by measuring the Doppler width of spectral lines of a collection of objects; the more radial velocities one measures, the more accurately one knows their dispersion.  A central velocity dispersion refers to the σ of the interior regions of an extended object, such as a galaxy or cluster.

The relationship between velocity dispersion and matter (or the observed electromagnetic radiation emitted by this matter) takes several forms in astronomy based on the object(s) being observed. For instance, the M–σ relation was found for material circling black holes, the Faber–Jackson relation for elliptical galaxies, and the Tully–Fisher relation for spiral galaxies. For example, the σ found for objects about the Milky Way's supermassive black hole (SMBH) is about 100 km/s.

Groups and clusters of galaxies have a wider range of velocity dispersions than smaller objects. Normal elliptical galaxies, by comparison, have an average .

Face-on spiral galaxies have a central ; slightly more if viewed edge-on.

See also
 M–σ relation – for material circling supermassive black holes
 Faber–Jackson relation – for elliptical galaxies
 Tully–Fisher relation – for spiral galaxies

References

Celestial mechanics
Galactic astronomy
Extragalactic astronomy
Equations of astronomy